The Shadow in My Eye (Danish: Skyggen i mit øje), also known as The Bombardment, is a 2021 Danish war drama film written and directed by Ole Bornedal. The film deals with, among other things, Operation Carthage carried out by the Royal Air Force (RAF) in Copenhagen, Denmark during the Second World War, where one of the planes crashed near Institut Jeanne d'Arc, causing the school to be misidentified as the target and also bombed.

Plot
In 1945, a Royal Air Force (RAF) de Havilland Mosquito strafes a car carrying several bridesmaids while flying over German-occupied Denmark, mistaking it for a German staff vehicle. The RAF pilots Pete and Andy learn about the accidental killing of civilians from the Danish Special Operation Executive agent Major Truelson. 

A teenage boy named Henry is traumatized by the strafing incident and loses his ability to speak. His parents send him to Copenhagen with the hope of improving his mental health. While living in Copenhagen, Henry boards with his cousin Rigmor and her family. Henry also becomes acquainted with Rigmor's friend Eva. Rigmor and Eva attend the Institut Jeanne d'Arc, a French-language Roman Catholic school run by nuns led by Sister Hanna. Rigmor and Eva help Henry to overcome his trauma including his fear of walking under open skies.

Meanwhile, a young novice named Sister Teresa struggles with her faith in God. In an attempt to prove God's existence, Teresa strikes an illicit romantic relationship with a HIPO officer named Frederik, who works for the German occupation authorities. Teresa also teaches Eva and Rigmor's class.

At the request of the Danish resistance, the Royal Air Force agrees to bomb the Shellhus, the Gestapo headquarters in Copenhagen with the goal of freeing imprisoned resistance members and destroying Gestapo documents. The planned Operation Carthage is complicated by the Germans imprisoning several Danish resistance hostages under the roof of the Shellhus. The air raid consists of several de Havilland Mosquito fighter-bombers from the RAF, the Royal Australian Air Force, and the Royal New Zealand Air Force, which are escorted by RAF P-51 Mustangs. 

On the day of Operation Carthage, Eva argues with her parents over not finishing a bowl of porridge. Frederik, persuaded by Teresa, informs his parents that he is deserting the service. While Eva and Rigmor attend a class, Sister Hanna confronts Teresa over her relationship with Frederik and announces plans to expel her from their order. During the air raid, Peter and Andy's Mosquito fighter-bomber hits a searchlight tower, causing it to crash near the Institut Jeanne d'Arc. Other Mosquito fighter-bombers mistake the school for the target and bomb the building, killing and wounding numerous students and teachers. However, other RAF bombers succeed in targeting the Shellhus, damaging the building and destroying Gestapo documents. In the ensuing chaos, several Danish resistance prisoners take the opportunity to escape. 

During the air raid, Henry gradually regains his ability to speak and assists firefighters with identifying the bodies of the wounded. Rigmor and Teresa are trapped under the rubble amidst rising water from fire hoses attempting to put out the flames above. Rescuers mistakenly drowning some they are trying to save is another layer of tragedy. Frederik attempts to rescue Teresa from the rubble, but she jumps into the water in an attempt to save Rigmor. However, she dislodges some rubble in the process and the two are crushed to death. Eva's parents are distraught when they are unable to find their daughter, with her father regretting arguing with her. When Henry suggests that Eva may have gone home, Eva's mother finds her daughter at home eating the cold porridge.

Cast 
 Fanny Bornedal, Teresa, novice
 Alex Høgh Andersen, Frederik, HIPO officer
 Danica Curcic, Rigmor's mother
 Bertram Bisgaard, Henry
 Ester Birch, Rigmor
 Ella Nilsson, Eva
 Malena Lucia Lodahl, Greta
 Alban Lendorf, Peter
 Inge Sofie Skovbo, Sister Hanna
 James Tarpey, Andy
 Malene Beltoft Olsen, Eva's mother
 Mads Riisom, Rigmors father
 Joen Højerslev, Jailor
 Jens Sætter-Lassen, Jailor
 Kristian Ibler, Eva's father
 Mathias Flint, Executioner
 Maria Rossing, Henry's mother
 Patricia Schumann, Director
 Casper Kjær Jensen, Svend Nielsen
 Nicklas Søderberg Lundstrøm, Truelsen
 Rikke Louise Andersson, Frederik's mother
 Susse Wold, Prioress
 Caspar Phillipson, Bateson
 Malthe Miehe-Renard, Ambulance doctor
 Ida Procter, Jenny
 Morten Suurballe, Doctor

Post production 
On November 12, 2021, it was announced that producer Miso Film would be changing the film. They would remove a scene where a named British pilot fires at a civilian vehicle. The pilot took part in the bombing and died when his plane crashed, but the scene of the shooting is fiction. Miso Film decided to change the scene after complaints from the pilot's family that the pilot was being portrayed as a murderer. According to film expert Peter Schepelern, it is unique for a film to be changed after its premiere because of complaints about the portrayal of historical figures.

Distribution
The Shadow in My Eye was distributed in Denmark in October 2021. Netflix acquired the international distribution rights for the movie, which was released under the name The Bombardment, in late March 2022.

Criticism by family relatives
In the opening sequence, the film depicts a fictitious fatal air attack on a group of innocent women carried out by the RAF pilot Peter Kleboe, who later crashes by the school in the main bombing campaign. The family of the real life Peter Kleboe demanded an apology in one of the largest Danish newspapers, Berlingske, on November 11, 2021, and that the film be recut since it portrayed their family member Kleboe as a killer of innocent victims and slandered his legacy. The following day, a producer for Miso Film stated that they had not intended to connect the fictional attack with real people, that editorial changes to the film would be made, and that they would contact the family members.

Historical research error
During the marketing of the film the director Bornedal made claims that the film was based on the best possible research. However in several interviews and a large TV show Bornedal claimed that a key final scene of the film were based on a real life conversation between a nun and a dying child. But when the Danish documentary filmmaker  investigated the story it turned out to be false. The conversation was between two nuns, and did not involve a dying child. Bornedal admitted the poor research and in a public response admitted that this might cast doubts on the historical accuracy of his film.

External links

References 

2021 films
2021 drama films
2021 war drama films
Danish war drama films
Danish historical films
World War II films based on actual events
Films directed by Ole Bornedal